The 1962 FIBA Africa Championship was the first FIBA Africa Championship regional basketball championship held by FIBA Africa. It was held in the United Arab Republic between 24 March and 30 March 1962. Five national teams entered the event under the auspices of FIBA Africa, the sport's regional governing body. The city of Cairo hosted the tournament. The United Arab Republic (Egypt) won the title after finishing in first place of the round robin group.

Results
All five teams competed in a round robin group that defined the final standings.

|}

External links
 1962 African Championship for Men, FIBA.com.

B
1962 in African basketball
AfroBasket
International basketball competitions hosted by Egypt
March 1962 sports events in Africa